Elisa Pedra Zamacois y Zabala (29 April 1838 in Bilbao – November 1915 in Buenos Aires) was a Spanish singer and actress. She was half-sister of the writer Niceto de Zamacois, and sister of the painter Eduardo Zamacois y Zabala, and the actor Ricardo Zamacois, and also was aunt of the writers Miguel Zamacoïs and Eduardo Zamacois, and the music composer Joaquín Zamacois.

Biography 
Elisa Pedra Zamacois y Zabala was born on 29 April 1838 in Bilbao, daughter of Miguel Antonio de Zamacois y Berreteaga, and his second wife, Ruperta María del Pilar de Zabala y Arauco.

Her family moved to Madrid, where worked at Teatro de la Zarzuela. She played Galatea in the homonym play along Modesto Landa (Pygmalion), Vicente Caltañazor (Midas) and Emilio Carratalá (Ganymede).

Between 1859 and 1884 she wrote Cartas de Elisa de Zamacois a Francisco A. Barbieri. She was the sister of the actor Ricardo.

References

1838 births
1915 deaths
Basque singers
Spanish sopranos
19th-century Spanish singers
19th-century Spanish actresses
20th-century Spanish actresses
People from Bilbao
Spanish stage actresses
Actresses from the Basque Country (autonomous community)